Town Pump is a Butte, Montana-based chain of truck stops, gas stations, casinos, hotels and convenience stores.

The chain has been in services since 1953, founded by Tom and Mary Kenneally.  The company would expand into convenience stores in the 1980s, and truck stops, car washes, laundromats, hotels, quick serves, delis and gaming establishments by the end of the 1990s.

Town Pump also has affiliation agreements with Pilot Travel Centers.

External links 
 

1953 establishments in Montana
Automotive fuel retailers
Casinos in Montana
American companies established in 1953
Retail companies established in 1953
Hotels established in 1953
Entertainment companies established in 1953
Companies based in Montana
Convenience stores of the United States
Gas stations in the United States
Truck stop chains